Cozzarelli is a surname. Notable people with the surname include:

Giosue Cozzarelli (born 1989), Panamanian beauty queen, model, and YouTube celebrity of Italian descent
Guidoccio Cozzarelli (1450–1517), Italian painter and miniaturist
Nicholas R. Cozzarelli (1938–2006), American biochemist